Celaenus may refer to:

In Greek mythology (Κελαινός Kelainos):

Celaenus, son of Poseidon and the Danaid Celaeno
Celaenus, father of Tragasia who was a possible spouse of Miletus
Celaenus, son of Phlyus and father of Caucon
See Celaenus (mythology)

In biology:

Hasora celaenus, a species in the genus Hasora